Kraemeria is a genus of goby, formerly the type genus of the family Kraemeriidae, but now classified in the Gobiidae. The species in this genus are native to the Indian and Pacific oceans.

Species
There are currently seven recognized species in this genus:
 Kraemeria bryani L. P. Schultz, 1941 (Bryan's sand dart)
 Kraemeria cunicularia Rofen, 1958 (Transparent sand dart)
 Kraemeria galatheaensis Rofen, 1958 (Galathea sand dart)
 Kraemeria merensis Whitley, 1935
 Kraemeria nuda (Regan, 1908)
 Kraemeria samoensis Steindachner, 1906 (Samoan sand dart)
 Kraemeria tongaensis Rofen, 1958

References

Kraemeriidae
Gobiidae